Juliet Mphande is a Zambian LGBT activist and director of Friends of Rainka Zambia. She is a human rights activist, journalist, and peace activist. Mphande has called on governments that colonised Africa to take responsibility for anti-sodomy laws they brought to the continent.

Friends of Rainka 
Mphande has been involved with the organisation in Zambia since its founding in 2007. She moved from a community advisory board to the Chair of the organisation's board, and then served as the Executive Director. The LGBT organisation is based in Lusaka.

References 

Living people
Zambian human rights activists
Zambian LGBT people
Zambian LGBT rights activists
Zambian journalists
Zambian women journalists
Zambian women writers
21st-century Zambian writers
21st-century Zambian women writers
Year of birth missing (living people)